Danielle Ellis (born 17 November 1991) is a Canadian sitting volleyball player who competes in international volleyball competitions, she plays as captain. She is a Parapan American Games bronze medalist and has competed at the 2016 and 2020 Summer Paralympics. She has been a member of the Canadian national sitting volleyball team since 2009.

Ellis works as an ambulance dispatcher in Langley.

References

1991 births
Living people
People from White Rock, British Columbia
People from Langley, British Columbia (city)
Canadian women's volleyball players
Canadian sitting volleyball players
Paralympic volleyball players of Canada
Volleyball players at the 2016 Summer Paralympics
Volleyball players at the 2020 Summer Paralympics
Medalists at the 2019 Parapan American Games